R51 may refer to:
 R51 (South Africa), a road
 , a destroyer of the Royal Navy
 , an aircraft carrier of the Royal Navy
 Nissan Pathfinder (R51), a sport utility vehicle
 R51: Toxic to aquatic organisms, a risk phrase
 Remington R51, a semi-automatic pistol